IMB is a three-letter abbreviation that may refer to:

Organizations
IMB Bank, an Australian banking institution
Indymac Bancorp, former NYSE symbol
Institute of Molecular Biology in Mainz, Germany
The International Maritime Bureau of the International Chamber of Commerce
The International Mission Board of the Southern Baptist Convention

Other
Independent Monitoring Board, of the conditions of prisoners in English jails
Integrated Media Block in digital cinema
Integrated Mobile Broadcast of TV over mobile telephony
Intelligent Mail Barcode, a barcode used on mail in the United States
Intermenstrual bleeding, uterine bleeding between the expected menstrual periods
Internal Market Bill, United Kingdom, proposals for trading mechanisms within the UK 
The Irvine-Michigan-Brookhaven detector, of neutrinos, Ohio, US